Lieutenant General Harinder Singh PVSM, AVSM,  YSM, SM, VSM, is a retired General Officer of the Indian Army. He retired from Indian Army after serving as commandant of Indian Military Academyin his last appointment. Previously, he was the Commander of XIV Corps (also known as Fire and Fury Corps) from October 2019 to October 2020, succeeding Lt Gen Yogesh Kumar Joshi, PVSM, UYSM, AVSM, VrC, SM, ADC.

Early life and education 
General Harinder Singh completed his schooling from Senior Secondary School, Bhilai. An alumnus of NDA and IMA, the officer has been an academy blue in hockey and represented his school and services at the national level.

Career 
The officer was commissioned into the Maratha Light Infantry Regiment, in Dec 1983. 
As a young lieutenant, he served in East Sikkim and Western Bhutan (1984-85). For an action in Bhutan, in 1984, he was awarded the Sena Medal Gallantry (SM). Later in 1994-95, he commanded an infantry company at Yak La, an important mountain pass along the watershed (LAC) in East Sikkim. 
As a colonel, he commanded a Rashtriya Rifles (RR) battalion in North Kashmir from 2001 to 2005. For his meritorious service in an intense counter insurgency environment, he was awarded the Yudh Seva Medal (YSM).
General Harinder Singh has the distinction of commanding two brigades during his service. He first commanded the Dera Baba Nanak (DBN) Brigade along the western borders and was later nominated to lead the United Nations Multinational Brigade (also called North Kivu Brigade) in Eastern Democratic Republic of Congo (DRC), in 2011-12. As Commander of the North Kivu Brigade (MONUSCO), he was instrumental in leading the peace enforement operations under Chapter VII to thwart the M23 rebellion from spreading in Eastern DRC.  
As a two star officer, he commanded an Infantry Division deployed along the Line of Control in North Kashmir (2016-2017). His formation played an important role in handling of the agitational dynamics in Jammu and Kashmir (post killing of Bhuran Wani) and was also responsible for steering the surgical strike in 2016.  
In October 2019, he was appointed as the Commander of 14 Corps in Eastern Ladakh. He handled the multiple standoffs and skirmishes including the Galwan action in the western sector and led the Indian Army delegation at successive corps commander level border meetings to negotiate the dis-engagement process along the LAC.
General Singh has held important positions at the Army Headquarters. He has been the Director General Military Intelligence (DGMI) during the Doklam crisis and Balakote strikes. He has been a Director at the Operational Logistics and Strategic Movement directorate and served as a general staff officer in the Military Operations (DGMO) directorate. He was instrumental in raising of the Directorate of Indian Army Veterans (DIAV) at the Army HQ and served as its first Deputy Director General. 
The officer has attended the Defence Services Staff College Course at Wellington on a competitive vacancy. He has also attended the Higher Command Course at the Army War College, Mhow. He is a recipient of the prestigious Colonel Pyarelal Gold Medal for best thesis submission at the National Defence College, New Delhi. The officer has held instructional appointments at Indian Military Academy, Dehradun and Infantry School, Mhow. He has served as a military staff officer with the United Nations Peacekeeping Mission in Angola (UNAVEM-III).
In October 2020, he was appointed as the Commandant of the Indian Military Academy and served as its head till his superannuation.

Writing 
The officer carries an abiding interest in strategic–military affairs and has published several working papers/ articles/ web commentaries. He has held fellowship positions at Manohar Parrikar Institute of Defence Studies and Analyses (MP-IDSA) New Delhi, S Rajaratnam School of International Studies (RSIS) Singapore and Asia Pacific Centre of Security Studies (APCSS) Hawaii, USA. He is a recipient of the IDSA Excellence Award-Year 2011 for research contribution in international journals/forums. 

 Essentiality of Resilience for National Security in 21st Century India. Policy Perspectives Foundation, 	November 2022.
● Establishing India’s Military Readiness Concerns and Strategy. IDSA Monograph Series No 5, 2011.
● India’s Emerging Land War fighting Doctrines and Capabilities. RSIS Working Paper No 210, October 13, 2010.
● Chapter in IDSA Task Force Report whither Pakistan? Growing Instability and Implications for India, Published by IDSA in June 2010.
● Chapter on Pakistan 2030: Possible Scenarios and Options for IDSA book Asia 2030: The Unfolding Future, Published by Lancer in 2010.
● Chapter in IDSA Task Force Report : A Case for Intelligence reforms in India, Published by IDSA in 2010.
● ‘Framing the Defence Strategic Context : Prospects and Concerns’. NDC Journal, July 2014.
● ‘Rethinking India’s Limited War Strategy’. Awaiting publication.
Articles (International Journals/Newspapers)
● Assessing India’s Emerging Land Warfare Doctrines and Capabilities :Prospects and Limitations. Asian Security, Routledge, 20 July 2011.
● Thinking Change in the Armed Forces. Journal of Defence Studies, IDSA.
● Reintegration versus Reconciliation, STRAITS TIMES, 23 Mar 2010, Singapore.

IDSA Issue/ Policy Briefs

● Profiling the Taliban Threat to India, June 2, 2009.
● Tackling or Trailing the Taliban: An Assessment, July 20, 2009.
● Countering the Naxalites, June 11, 2010..
● New Vocabulary and Imagery, August, 3, 2010.
● Afghanistan: Firewall is Better than Partition, October 7, 2010.
● A Passage through India? October 21, 2010.
● Professional Military Education : The First Steps in the Indian Context, November 30, 2010.
● Forging India’s Hard Power in the New Century, January 24, 2011.

IDSA Web Commentaries

● Fighting the Taliban : Challenges for Pakistan Army, May 01, 2009.
● The Pakistani Taliban: An existential or a passing threat ?, September 23, 2009.
● Re-strategizing the Afpak Campaign, October 22, 2009.
● Defence Acquisitions: The Question of Systemic Inefficiencies, December 3, 2009.
● AfPak : Muddled Strategies and Expectations, December 11, 2009.
● Pakistan ISI: The Patron and the Victim, December 24, 2009.
● The Hard Lesson of Chintalnar, May 10, 2010.
● Learning from Times Square: Socialising the Counter Terrorism Approach, May 31, 2010.
● Always in the Line of Fire, June 22, 2010.
● Indo Pak Rapprochement: Unexplored Option of Military to Military Engagement, June 25, 2010.
● AFSPA: A Soldier’s Perspective, July 6, 2010.
● Kashmir: Time to Ring the Bell, October 13, 2010.
● Managing the 3Ms of Military Readiness, January 24, 2011.

RSIS Web Commentaries

● India’s Pune Blast: Hinting of another 26/11, RSIS Commentary No 21.
● Reintegration versus Reconciliation in Afghanistan, RSIS Commentary No 3.

Misc Papers

● Article titled “India’s Defence: The Shifts we are Truly Missing”,Business & Economy Magazine, Feb 2011.
● Article titled “Naxalism” in Hindustan Times (Hindi Edition) published on June 13, 2010.
● Article titled “Forging India’s Hard Power in the New Century”, CLAWS Journal published in Nov, 2011.
● Thesis on “Shaping a Comprehensive Politico Military Guidance in The Indian Context” in NDC Journal, Volume-35, Number-3, Year-2014.

Honours and decorations 
The Officer has been awarded with the Param Vishisht Seva Medal (PVSM) in 2021, Ati Vishisht Seva Medal (AVSM) in 2017, Yudh Seva Medal (YSM) in 2005,  Sena Medal (SM-G) for gallantry in 1984 and Vishist Seva Medal (VSM) in 2016.

Dates of rank

See also 
 List of serving generals of the Indian Army

References 

Living people
Indian Army officers
Indian generals
Recipients of the Vishisht Seva Medal
Recipients of the Sena Medal
Recipients of the Yudh Seva Medal
Recipients of the Ati Vishisht Seva Medal
Year of birth missing (living people)
National Defence Academy (India) alumni
Commandants of Indian Military Academy
Recipients of the Param Vishisht Seva Medal
Defence Services Staff College alumni